Penistone and Stocksbridge is a constituency in the House of Commons of the UK Parliament represented since 2019 by Miriam Cates, a Conservative. As with all constituencies, adults qualifying to vote in the seat (its electorate) elect one Member of Parliament (MP) by the first past the post system of election at least every five years.

Boundaries 

The Metropolitan Borough of Barnsley wards of Dodworth, Penistone East, and Penistone West, and the Sheffield wards of Stocksbridge and Upper Don, East Ecclesfield and West Ecclesfield.

History 
The seat largely resembles the old Penistone Constituency, which, following the election of a Conservative in the Conservative landslide in 1931, returned MPs representing the Labour Party through to its abolition in 1983.

In 1983, two new constituencies were formed, Sheffield Hillsborough and Barnsley West and Penistone, both of which returned Labour MPs at every election they were fought.

The 2010 result was that of a marginal Labour majority. In 2015, the Labour majority increased, partly due to a split right-wing vote between the Conservatives and UKIP, while the Liberal Democrats' vote decline largely benefited Labour in the seat.

When the UKIP vote declined in 2017, with a large amount of those voters going to the Conservatives causing a swing of almost 6% against Labour, the seat became extremely marginal.

Elected as a member of the Labour Party, MP Angela Smith quit the party in February 2019 and joined Change UK. She left this party in June 2019 and joined The Independents. She departed the parliamentary group in September 2019 and joined the Liberal Democrats. Smith chose not to defend her seat at the 2019 election; she instead contested Altrincham and Sale West for the Liberal Democrats, failing to gain the seat. In this election, the Conservatives gained Penistone and Stocksbridge to gain one of three seats in South Yorkshire, their first since before the 1997 general election.

Constituency profile 
The seat is most heavily populated on its eastern fringe, with communities built largely on the coal and steel industries, such as the ex-mining village of Dodworth and the steelworking town of Stocksbridge. Penistone too has a history of steelworking at the David Brown and high-tech foundries although many local people are or have been employed at the Hepworth pipeworks (formerly Hepworth Iron Co./Hepworth Building Products) which specialises in the manufacture of pipes, mains and domestic and whose fortunes vary with demand in construction. To the south lies the densely populated, northern Sheffield suburbs of Chapeltown with its rich industrial history, Ecclesfield, Grenoside and High Green. Between these urban areas are rural villages including Oxspring, Wortley, Green Moor and Thurgoland occupied mostly by commuters to Sheffield (as well as those for Leeds and Manchester). The western area of the constituency is in the Peak District National Park.

The seat contains three significant stately homes: Cannon Hall (home of the Spencer-Stanhope family of Pre-Raphaelites) is open to the public as the 13th/18th Royal Hussars Museum, while Wortley Hall (ancestral home of the Wortley-Montagu family) is largely used by trade unions and their families; the third is Wentworth Castle, where an adult educational establishment, Northern College, is based.

Members of Parliament

Elections

Elections in the 2010s

}

* Served as an MP in the 2005–2010 Parliament

See also 
 List of parliamentary constituencies in South Yorkshire

Notes

References

Sources
Sheffield Recommendations of the Boundary Commission for England.
Summary of the Sheffield Parliamentary Boundary Review.

Politics of Penistone
Stocksbridge
Parliamentary constituencies in Yorkshire and the Humber
Constituencies of the Parliament of the United Kingdom established in 2010
Politics of Barnsley